Derek C. Jones (born c. 1946) is the Irma M. and Robert D. Morris Professor of Economics at Hamilton College who has contributed to the economics of participation, and pioneered the econometric analysis of productivity of worker cooperatives, employee ownership, and profit-sharing firms.

He formerly served as visiting professor at the Helsinki School of Economics, Pembroke College (Oxford University), Hitotsobashi University, the London Business School, visiting scholar at Cambridge University, research fellow at Manchester University and Warwick University, and visiting fellow at Copenhagen Business School, the Arbetslivcentrum (Stockholm) and the European University Institute, (Florence).

He received his Ph.D. from Cornell University and his masters from the London School of Economics. He has served on doctoral dissertation committees as numerous universities, including Cornell and Copenhagen Business School.

References

1940s births
Living people
Cornell University alumni
Hamilton College (New York) faculty
Economists from New York (state)
21st-century American economists